The Men's Pole Vault event at the 2005 World Championships in Athletics was held at the Helsinki Olympic Stadium on August 9 and August 11.

Medalists

Schedule
All times are Eastern European Time (UTC+2)

Records

Results

Qualification

Qualification: Qualifying Performance 5.60 (Q) or at least 12 best performers (q) advance to the final.

Final

External links
IAAF results, heats
IAAF results, final

Pole vault
Pole vault at the World Athletics Championships